A casbah, or kasbah, (Arabic: "القصبة") or Qassabah, is a unique kind of medina or fortress.

Casbah and similar may refer to:

Notable casbahs
 Almohad Kasbah, formerly of Marrakesh, Morocco
 Casbah of Algiers, in Algiers, Algeria
 Casbah of Dellys, in Dellys, Algeria
 Kasbah of Agadir, in Agadir, Morocco
 Kasbah An-Nouar, in Fez, Morocco
 Kasbah of Béja, in Béja, Tunisia
 Kasbah Boulaouane, in Boulaouane, Morocco
 Kasbah Cherarda, in Fez, Morocco
 Kasbah of Le Kef, in El Kef, Tunisia
 Kasbah Mahdiyya, near Kenitra, Morocco
 Kasbah of Marrakesh, in Marrakesh, Morocco
 Kasbah of Moulay Ismail, in Meknes, Morocco
 Kasbah of Tifoultoute, in Ouarzazate, Morocco
 Kasbah of Sfax, in Sfax, Tunisia
 Kasbah of the Udayas, in Rabat, Morocco
 Tamnougalt, in Tamnougalt, Morocco
 Telouet Kasbah, in Telouet, Morocco

Other uses
 Casbah City, a 2017 Algerian TV series
 The Casbah (music venue), in San Diego, USA
 Casbah Coffee Club (also known as The Casbah), a former music venue in Liverpool, England
 Casbah Recording Studio, in California, USA
 Casbah (film), a 1948 musical film
 Cloud access security broker (CASB) (sometimes pronounced "cas-bah"), security software for cloud computing
 Casbah is a roadhouse chain in Pretoria and Johannesburg, South Africa established in 1955
 Kasba Tadla, a town in Béni-Mellal Province, Morocco

See also
"Rock the Casbah", a 1982 song by The Clash
CASBAA, association for TV broadcast service providers in Asia
Qasba, a Maltese unit of measurement equal to approximately 2.096m